Donald Trump is closely associated with the sport of golf. As a real estate developer, Trump began acquiring and constructing golf courses in 1999. By the time of his election as United States President in 2016, he owned 17 golf courses worldwide through his holding company, the Trump Organization. Courses owned by Trump have been selected to host various PGA and LPGA events, including the 2022 PGA Championship (although the PGA terminated this in the aftermath of the 2021 United States Capitol attack). A spokesman for the Trump Organization said that "This is a breach of a binding contract and they have no right to terminate the agreement".

Following his election, Trump broke precedent with recent presidents and chose not to divest from his business holdings, including his golf courses. Although not illegal, this led to criticism from ethics lawyers and journalists for potential conflicts of interest. At least three lawsuits (D.C. and Maryland v. Trump, Blumenthal v. Trump and CREW v. Trump) have been filed claiming that foreign payments at Trump golf courses and hotels violate the Emoluments Clause of the Constitution.

Background
Trump, according to Jack Nicklaus, "loves the game of golf more than he loves money". According to Golf Digest, his handicap is as low as 2.8. Trump began playing golf during his college years at the University of Pennsylvania. In the introduction to his 2005 book The Best Golf Advice I Ever Received, Trump wrote, "for me and millions of people—men, women, young and old around the world—golf is more than a game. It is a passion."

In 1999, Trump opened his first golf course: the Trump International Golf Club, West Palm Beach in Florida. Land for the US$45 million course was acquired through a lawsuit against Palm Beach County, Florida, after Trump's purchase of the Mar-a-Lago resort. By 2007, Trump owned 4 courses around the US. Following the financial crisis of 2007–2008, Trump began purchasing existing golf courses and re-designing them.

Golf courses owned by Trump hosted the LPGA Tour finale from 2001 to 2008, as well as the 2009 US Junior Amateur and US Junior Girls Championships. In 2014, the Professional Golfers' Association of America announced a multi-year partnership with the Trump Organization. The PGA of America selected Trump golf courses to host the 2017 Senior PGA Championship and the 2022 PGA Championship.

In June 2015, Trump announced his candidacy in the 2016 presidential election with a controversial speech which led to companies such as Macy's and NBC cutting ties with the businessman. While speaking on illegal immigration, Trump claimed that Mexico is "sending people that have lots of problems... they're bringing drugs, they're bringing crime. They're rapists. And some, I assume, are good people," drawing criticism from immigration and Latino advocacy groups. The LPGA, PGA of America, PGA Tour, and United States Golf Association issued a joint statement, saying that while the organizations "do not usually comment on presidential politics, Mr. Trump's comments are inconsistent with our strong commitment to an inclusive and welcoming environment in the game of golf." The PGA of America also decided to relocate the 2015 PGA Grand Slam of Golf—an exhibition match which had been scheduled to take place at Trump National Golf Club, Los Angeles. Other upcoming events at Trump courses were not affected. In 2018, PGA Tour Latinoamérica held its Shell Tour Championship at Trump National Doral Miami's Golden Palm course after plans were announced to demolish the Melreese Country Club in Miami, which had held the event, for a football stadium.

Golf courses owned

As of December 2016, Trump owned golf courses in the United States and abroad. Over nearly two decades (as he reported in his 2000–2018 tax filings), these golf courses had combined losses of $315.6 million.

United States 

Trump National Golf Club, Bedminster, New Jersey – purchased in 2002.
 Trump National Golf Club, Charlotte, North Carolina – designed by Greg Norman, located on Lake Norman, purchased in 2012. 
 Trump National Golf Club, Colts Neck, New Jersey – purchased in 2008.
 Trump National Golf Club, Hudson Valley, New York – purchased in 2010.
Trump National Golf Club, Jupiter, Florida – purchased in December 2012.
Trump National Golf Club, Los Angeles
Trump National Doral Golf Club, Florida
Trump International Golf Club, West Palm Beach, Florida
Trump National Golf Club, Philadelphia (located in Pine Hill, New Jersey)
Trump National Golf Club, Washington, D.C.
Trump National Golf Club, Westchester, New York

Outside of the U.S. 
Trump International Golf Links, Scotland
Trump International Golf Links and Hotel Ireland
Trump Turnberry, Scotland

Golf courses managed by the Trump Organization

The Trump Organization also operates golf courses not owned by them.

Puerto Rico
In 2007, the Trump Organization took over the management and licensed Trump’s name to the 4-year old, 36-hole oceanfront golf course at Coco Beach, Puerto Rico. It hosted the 2008 PGA Puerto Rico Open, but the club kept  losing money and in 2015 filed for bankruptcy protection.

Ferry Point, New York
The Trump Organization operates the Trump Golf Links at Ferry Point, New York, a public golf course built and owned by New York City, under a 20-year contract awarded in 2013 by the administration of then-Mayor Bloomberg. The course opened in 2015. Under the agreement, the city paid the course's utility and water bills while collecting no income for the first four years. In the first year of operation, ending in March 2016, the company had $8 million in gross receipts, and the city paid $1 million in water and sewage bills. In the second year of operation, gross receipts dropped 9.5%. For the operating year that ended March 2019, the Trump Organization reported a loss of $122,000; it now faces contractual fees of at least $300,000 per operating year from the city.

On January 13, 2021, New York City mayor Bill de Blasio announced that the city government would be terminating all contracts with the Trump Organization effective November 14, 2021, for "directly incit[ing] a deadly insurrection at the U.S. Capitol." The city of New York also stated that the Trump Organization had defaulted in its contractual obligations because it had failed to attract a major tournament. In June 2021, the Trump Organization sued the city for wrongful termination of the contract. The court allowed the Trump Organization to continue operating the golf course while the case was pending. In April 2022, the judge ruled that "the city had not given a valid legal reason for ending the contract."

Dubai
According to the Trump Organization, it is neither the owner nor the developer of the Trump International Golf Club. The financial disclosures Trump filed with the Federal Election Commission in 2016 show that the Trump Organization manages the two golf courses in Dubai. The second Trump-branded golf course, the Trump World Golf Club, was designed by Tiger Woods and developed and built by DAMAC Properties, a company founded by Hussain Sajwani. It was scheduled to be opened in 2017, the year in which a report revealed that migrants working on the project were not being paid on time. In February 2021, it was announced that the inauguration was delayed at least until 2022, as the work on the project was paused. Some officials working on the construction project were told that the delay was because of the COVID-19 pandemic, but developers in the Emirates were reportedly struggling to finish such developments even before the global health crisis.

Coats of arms

Trump has used a number of logos in the style of coats of arms for his businesses.

Joseph E. Davies, third husband of Marjorie Merriweather Post and a former U.S. ambassador of Welsh origins, was granted a coat of arms, bearing the motto Integritas, by British heraldic authorities in 1939. After Donald Trump purchased Mar-a-Lago, the Florida estate built by Merriweather Post, in 1985, the Trump Organization started using Davies's coat of arms at Trump golf courses and estates across the country. It was also registered with the U.S. patent and trademark office.

In 2008, Trump attempted to establish the American logo at his new Trump International Golf Links in Balmedie, Scotland, but was warned by the Lord Lyon King of Arms, the highest authority for Scottish heraldry, that an act of the Scottish Parliament from 1672 disallows people using unregistered arms. In January 2012, shortly after the inauguration of the golf course, Trump unveiled the new coat of arms that had been granted to The Trump International Golf Course Scotland Ltd by the Court of the Lord Lyon, Scotland's heraldic authority, in 2011.

From 2014, Trump used the same logo for the Trump International Golf Links, Ireland, the golf resort built from his acquisition of Doonbeg Golf Club.

Presidency
Following his election in 2016, Trump announced that he would not divest his business holdings, as other recent presidents had. Instead, Trump kept his ownership stake in the Trump Organization and appointed his sons Donald Trump Jr. and Eric Trump to manage the business. In an unusual rebuke from the Office of Government Ethics, director Walter Shaub called Trump's actions "wholly inadequate" and "meaningless from a conflict of interest perspective." In an interview with The New York Times, Trump explained: "As far as the, you know, potential conflict of interests, though, I mean I know that from the standpoint, the law is totally on my side, meaning, the president can’t have a conflict of interest."

Just days after his inauguration, a lawsuit was filed in federal court seeking to block the president from receiving payments from foreign government entities at his businesses. The lawsuit alleged that these payments constitute a violation of the Foreign Emoluments Clause of the United States Constitution. In February 2017, the president invited Prime Minister of Japan Shinzō Abe to play at the Trump International Golf Club in Florida and stay at Trump's Mar-a-Lago resort. Legal and ethical concerns were raised by organizations such as the Sunlight Foundation over foreign payments the president may receive from the visit. Trump has vowed to donate any such payments to the Treasury Department, although the specifics of this arrangement remain unclear. In June 2017, the attorneys general of Maryland and the District of Columbia filed a separate lawsuit, claiming the president was "flagrantly violating" the Emoluments Clause.

A 2016 investigation by USA Today found that lobbyists and corporate executives had been purchasing memberships at Trump golf courses to gain favor or contact with the president. Membership fees at Trump courses can exceed US$100,000, leading to ethical concerns over a sitting president accepting money from people lobbying the government.

While campaigning to be president, Trump declared in August 2016: "I'm going to be working for you. I'm not going to have time to play golf". After becoming president, the amount of time he spent golfing generated controversy. Despite frequently criticizing his predecessor Barack Obama as having played golf too much as president, Trump golfed 11 times during his first eight weeks in office, when Obama did not golf at all in his first eight weeks, although Golf Digest concluded that Obama played 306 rounds of golf over his two terms, which the magazine describes as "...a fairly remarkable amount of golf while in office."

According to CNN, Trump visited Trump-owned golf courses 92 times between becoming president in January 2017 and January 3, 2018, although the White House does not disclose when the president actually plays golf during a visit to a golf course. The White House on some occasions denied that Trump played golf during his visits even after photos published on social media showed him playing golf. In November 2018, The Washington Post found that the average number of days between golf rounds was around 5 days for Trump, and around 12–13 days for Obama.

Journalists and ethics experts have alleged that these frequent visits are a means of boosting publicity at the courses to sell more memberships. White House Press Secretary Sarah Huckabee Sanders defended the president's golfing, saying that his time on the course was spent "developing deeper and better relationships with members of Congress in which those relationships have helped push forward the president's agenda." CNN reported in January 2018 that Trump was known to have played golf with members of Congress only seven times at a Trump-owned golf course.

Vice President Mike Pence stayed at the Trump International Golf Links and Hotel Ireland in 2019 while meeting with Irish officials in Dublin. Pence was originally going to end his trip in Doonbeg, where he has familial ties, but Trump suggested that he stay at the Trump property instead, which required daily flights of a more than one hour each way.

See also

 List of presidential trips made by Donald Trump (2017)
 List of presidential trips made by Donald Trump (2018)
 List of presidential trips made by Donald Trump (2019)
 List of presidential trips made by Donald Trump (2020)
 List of things named after Donald Trump
 Presidential Conflicts of Interest Act

References

External links

 Trump Golf, Official website
 Trump Golf Count
"First Golfer: Donald Trump's relationship with golf has never been more complicated" by Alan Shipnuck, originally appeared in the August 7, 2017 edition of Sports Illustrated

Donald Trump
Golf people